Warrap (also spelled Warab), is a state in South Sudan located in the Bahr el Ghazal region. It has an area of 31,027 km².

The governor of Warrap State is Manhiem Bol Malek who replaced Aleu Ayieny Aleu in November 2022.

Overview
Warrap State comprises an area of 31,027 km². Kuajok is the capital of Warrap state. All states in South Sudan are divided into counties, each headed by a County Commissioner appointed by the President of the Republic of South Sudan

The state became part of South Sudan after a successful secession from Sudan on 9 July 2011.

Location
Warrap State is located in the Bahr el Ghazal region. To its north lies the disputed region of Abyei, to its east lies Unity State. To the west is Western Bahr el Ghazal and Northern Bahr el Ghazal, and to its south lies the Lakes State.

People
The state is home to the Luanyjang, Twic, Jur-Man Anger, Bongo and Rek subtribes of Nilotic ethnicity. The Twic, Luanyjang, and Rek are of  Dinka tribes.

Warrap State is also home to the late Manute Bol who hailed from Twic county.
Upon his death in 2010, NBA basketball star Manute Bol was buried in the Warrap state in his hometown of Turalei.

The president of the Republic of South Sudan, Gen. Salva Kiir Mayardit is a native of Warrap State. Alek Wek, a prominent International model of South Sudan descent  and British citizenship, also hailed from the state.

Government
The state constitution was adopted in 2008. Lewis Anei Madut-Kuendit was the first governor of the state and Akech Tong Aleu was the last governor of Warrap state. Madot Dut Deng was the last Speaker of the State Assembly.

Religion

The main religions in Warrap State are the African Traditional Religion Christianity (Catholicism, Protestantism). A sizable proportion of the population practices African traditional religions.

References

 
States of South Sudan
Bahr el Ghazal